Harry Cameron was an ice hockey player.

Harry Cameron may also refer to:

Harry Cameron (rugby league) (1947–2021), Australian rugby league footballer

See also
Henry Cameron (disambiguation)
Harold Cameron (1912–2000), New Zealand cricketer